Waikawa is a small settlement to the north east of Picton, Marlborough, New Zealand. Waikawa Bay opens onto Queen Charlotte Sound.

Waikawa is an important New Zealand tourist destination because its large marina acts as gateway to the Marlborough Sounds and famous treks (hikes) such as the Queen Charlotte Track. 

Waikawa is host to Waikawa Marina which is one of the largest marinas in New Zealand. Waikawa Marina hosts 600 yacht berths and 70 individual lock-up boatsheds.  The marina offers a typical range of modern on-site marine services, supplies, and facilities. These facilities include a café/bar and accommodation.

Demographics

Waikawa had a population of 1,464 at the 2018 New Zealand census, an increase of 192 people (15.1%) since the 2013 census, and an increase of 345 people (30.8%) since the 2006 census. There were 609 households. There were 735 males and 729 females, giving a sex ratio of 1.01 males per female. The median age was 57.4 years (compared with 37.4 years nationally), with 183 people (12.5%) aged under 15 years, 129 (8.8%) aged 15 to 29, 654 (44.7%) aged 30 to 64, and 498 (34.0%) aged 65 or older.

Ethnicities were 88.1% European/Pākehā, 15.4% Māori, 1.6% Pacific peoples, 1.8% Asian, and 2.3% other ethnicities (totals add to more than 100% since people could identify with multiple ethnicities).

The proportion of people born overseas was 18.6%, compared with 27.1% nationally.

Although some people objected to giving their religion, 52.0% had no religion, 37.7% were Christian, 0.4% were Hindu, 0.2% were Muslim, 0.4% were Buddhist and 1.4% had other religions.

Of those at least 15 years old, 183 (14.3%) people had a bachelor or higher degree, and 270 (21.1%) people had no formal qualifications. The median income was $30,200, compared with $31,800 nationally. The employment status of those at least 15 was that 537 (41.9%) people were employed full-time, 219 (17.1%) were part-time, and 36 (2.8%) were unemployed.

Education
Waikawa Bay School is a coeducational contributing primary (years 1-6) school  with a roll of  students as of 

A native school existed at Waikawa Pa by 1877.

References

External links
Queen Charlotte Track
Waikawa Marina
 Waikawa Bay School website

Populated places in the Marlborough Region
Marlborough Sounds
Populated places in the Marlborough Sounds